The Alice Salomon University of Applied Sciences Berlin (or ASH) is a vocational university for social work, public health and early childhood education in Berlin, Germany.

History
The university was founded in 1899 by Alice Salomon, a strong advocate for women's rights and social justice.  During its early years it was named the "Social School for Women". In 1925, she created an initiative to train women in pedagogy and social work. Though students were mostly from Germany, the school admitted some foreign students, like Rayna Petkova, who would become one of the first professionally trained social workers of Bulgaria. The curricula included both theoretical training and required practical experience. Among the courses offered were family problems, pedagogy, population analysis and change, psychology, social health organization, social work as a profession, youth services, among others. Some of the teachers of the courses, besides Salomon, included Käthe Bonikowsky, Margarethe Freiin von Erffa, Elly Heuss-Knapp, Hilde Lion, Elisabeth Nietzsche, and Helene Weber, among others.

It admitted only women applicants until 1945. It was renamed the Alice Salomon School in 1932 in commemoration of Salomon's 60th birthday. In 1933, the Nazi Party came to power and Alice Salomon was banned from the school and a large number of instructors of Jewish descent were fired. In 1937, Alice Salomon was expelled from Germany and emigrated to the United States. It was not until 1954 that the school reinstated the name "Alice Salomon School".

The school was recognized as a State University of Applied Sciences for Social Work and Social Pedagogy in 1971 and was granted the right to confer degrees, although it once again lost the name "Alice Salomon". In 1991, the 'Alice Salomon University of Applied Sciences' was established as the official name of the university.

Today
The Alice Salomon University is now Germany's oldest and largest training institution of higher education in social work.  It is recognized as one of Germany's most research-intensive universities of applied sciences in the social field. One of the cornerstones of the university is applied research.

The modern university building is situated in the district of Berlin named  Hellersdorf, nicknamed "Helle-Mitte" (Bright Centre). The square on which the building is located is named after Alice Salomon. Cooperation between the university and the district of Hellersdorf include community projects involving children and youth and the issue of urban development.

See also
 Universities, colleges, and research institutions in Berlin
 Institute of Technology

References

External links
Homepage 
History

 
Educational institutions established in 1899
1899 establishments in Germany
Universities and colleges in Berlin
Universities of Applied Sciences in Germany